Fire Will Come is a 2019 internationally co-produced Galician language drama film directed by Oliver Laxe. Filmed in the Serra dos Ancares area of Galicia, many of the cast were local people and not professional actors.

Plot
The story takes place in the Serra dos Ancares mountain range in the Galician province of Lugo, in north west Spain. It tells the story of Amador Coro, who has recently been released from prison after a conviction for arson – he had started a fire in the thick forests that cover the local mountains. Returning to live with his mother Benedicta in her farm house, he lives an uneventful life, tending his mother's cows and avoiding unnecessary contact with other people. However, when a large forest fire devastates the area, tensions against him appear due to his arson conviction.

Cast

 Amador Arias Mon as Amador Coro
 Benedicta Sánchez as Benedicta, Amador's Mother
 Inazio Brao as Inazio
 Nuria Sotelo as Nuria
 Rubén Gómez Coelho as Ruben
 Iván Yáñez as Ivan
 Luis Manuel Guerrero Sánchez as Luis Manuel
 Luna as German Shepherd dog

Reception
The film was screened in the Un Certain Regard section at the 2019 Cannes Film Festival, where it won the Jury Prize. The film competed at the  34th Mar del Plata International Film Festival, the most prestigious film festival in Latin America, where it won the Golden Astor for Best Film.

In 2019, Benedicta Sánchez was awarded the Castelao Medal by the President of the Regional Government of Galicia for her performance as the mother. The medal is awarded to those who promote Galician culture.

Accolades 

|-
| align = "center" rowspan = "4"  | 2020 || rowspan = "4" | 34th Goya Awards || colspan = "2" | Best Film ||  || rowspan = "4" | 
|-
| Best Director || Oliver Laxe || 
|-
| Best New Actress || Benedicta Sánchez || 
|-
| Best Cinematography || Mauro Herce || 
|}

References

External links
 

2019 films
2019 drama films
Spanish drama films
Galician-language films
Films about arson
Films about wildfires
Films directed by Oliver Laxe
Films set in Galicia (Spain)
Kowalski Films films
2010s Spanish films